The province of Oristano is a province in the autonomous island region of Sardinia in Italy. Its capital is the city of Oristano. There are 87 municipalities (comuni) in the province).

It is bordered with on the north by Province of Sassari, on east by the Province of Nuoro, on south by the Province of South Sardinia and it is bathed from the Sea of Sardinia to the west.

History
The province of Oristano is the smallest province in Sardinia and was formed from sections of the provinces of Cagliari and Nuoro. It occupies roughly the same area as the Giudicato of Arborea of the High Middle Ages. It borders Nuoro, Cagliari and the Sea of Sardinia. A large area of the province's coastline is part of the gulf of Oristano, and the land in the province is mainly flat and there is some marshland. The province contains Santa Giusta (commune) and Tharros (former city), which both date from the Carthaginian Republic's rule of the area.

The town of Arborea was founded by Benito Mussolini's fascist regime as Mussolinia to be an experimental town, for which, farmers were moved from Emilia Romagna and Veneto. The River Tirso flows through the province of Oristano from the province of Nuoro, and its mouth is located at the Gulf of Oristano. Temo is the only other river to flow through the province. The town of Bosa is located in the region alongside a river and its medieval fortifications remain. The province of Oristano was formed in 1975 and had been largely unaffected/undamaged by tourism.

Communes
The province has a total of 87 communes, the largest of which are:

Government

List of presidents of the province of Oristano

References

External links

 Official website

 
Oristano
Oristano
Oristano